Little Matterhorn is a 7,886-foot (2,404 meter) elevation mountain summit located in the Lewis Range, of Glacier National Park in the U.S. state of Montana. The nearest higher peak is Edwards Mountain,  to the south. Precipitation runoff from the mountain drains into creeks which empty into Lake McDonald. Based on the Köppen climate classification, Little Matterhorn has an alpine climate characterized by long, usually very cold winters, and short, cool to mild summers. Winter temperatures can drop below −10 °F with wind chill factors below −30 °F.

Geology

Like other mountains in Glacier National Park, Little Matterhorn is composed of sedimentary rock laid down during the Precambrian to Jurassic periods.

See also
 Geology of the Rocky Mountains
 List of mountains and mountain ranges of Glacier National Park (U.S.)

Gallery

References

External links
 Lake McDonald web cam with Little Matterhorn on the right: National Park Service
 Little Matterhorn: Weather
 Climbing Little Matterhorn: YouTube

Lewis Range
Mountains of Flathead County, Montana
Mountains of Glacier National Park (U.S.)
Mountains of Montana
North American 2000 m summits